Sportvereinigung Arminen Wien also known as SV Arminen or simply Arminen is an Austrian field hockey club based in Vienna. It competes in the Austrian Bundesliga which they have won a record 19 times in the men's competition. Their home ground is the Waldstadion and they were founded on 24 April 1919.

The first men's team regularly plays in the Euro Hockey League. In the past, the club also had other sports but since 1938 they only have hockey.

Honours

Men
Austrian Bundesliga
 Winners (20): 1945–46, 1946–47, 1947–48, 1948–49, 1950–51, 1952–53, 1976, 1980, 1983, 1985, 1986, 1987, 1988, 2012–13, 2013–14, 2015–16, 2016–17, 2017–18, 2018–19, 2021–22
EuroHockey Club Trophy
 Runners-up (2): 1988, 2017
Austrian Indoor Bundesliga
 Winners (26): 1975, 1976, 1977, 1978, 1979, 1980, 1981, 1982, 1983, 1984, 1985, 1986, 1987, 1988, 1989, 2002–03, 2004–05, 2005–06, 2010–11, 2012–13, 2013–14, 2014–15, 2015–16, 2016–17, 2017–18, 2018–19
EuroHockey Indoor Club Cup
 Runners-up (6): 2007, 2015, 2016, 2017, 2019, 2020
EuroHockey Indoor Club Trophy
 Winners (1): 2014
 Runners-up (1): 2004

Women
Austrian Bundesliga
 Winners (20): 1948–49, 1957–58, 1978, 1981, 1982, 1983, 1984, 1985, 1986, 1987, 1992, 1998–99, 2002–03, 2011–12, 2012–13, 2013–14, 2014–15, 2015–16, 2016–17, 2017–18
Austrian Indoor Bundesliga
 Winners (21): 1958–59, 1980, 1983, 1984, 1985, 1986, 1987, 1988, 1989, 1992, 1997–98, 2009–10, 2010–11, 2011–12, 2013–14, 2014–15, 2015–16, 2016–17, 2017–18, 2018–19, 2019–20
EuroHockey Indoor Club Trophy
 Winners (3): 2011, 2015, 2019
EuroHockey Cup Winners Trophy
 Winners (1): 1992

References

External links

Austrian field hockey clubs
Field hockey clubs established in 1919
1919 establishments in Austria
Sports clubs in Vienna